Zaim commune in a Căușeni District, Moldova, located 7 km from the district seat Căușeni. It is composed of three villages: Marianca de Sus, Zaim and Zaim station.

Demographics
As of the 2014 Moldovan Census, it had a population of 4,281, of whom 3,807 are Moldovans, 368 Romanians, 27 Russians, 12 Ukrainians, and 67 other/undeclared. The dominant language is Romanian.

History
Zaim is well known in Moldova as the home village of Alexei Mateevici, a famous Bessarabian poet and national activist. Mateevici's house is currently a museum. In Zaim there is also a Museum of the Spirit of Southern Moldova, that includes exhibits of a number of artists and writers with origins in southern Bessarabia.

Notable people
 Alexei Mateevici 
 Vasile Cijevschi
 Petru Cărare

References

Communes of Căușeni District